Guthrie High School may refer to:

Guthrie High School (Oklahoma)
Guthrie High School (Texas)